Monheim am Rhein is a town on the right (eastern) bank of the river Rhine in North Rhine-Westphalia, Germany. Monheim belongs to the district of Mettmann – with the southern suburbs of Düsseldorf to the north, and the Bergisches Land to the south. It consists of the city districts (from north to south) Baumberg (about one third) and Monheim (two thirds).

Adjacent cities and districts
The following cities and districts border Monheim am Rhein:
to the north Düsseldorf, to the east Langenfeld (also part of the district of Mettmann), to the south Leverkusen and (both divided by the river Rhine) Cologne to the southwest, and Dormagen to the west (part of the district of Neuss).

History

Monheim has approximately 850 years of recorded history. It was first documented in 1150 as a fishermen's village in the Grafschaft (Earldom) Berg. It became the administrative centre for the surrounding villages (including many of the villages that now form Düsseldorf) in 1363, and stayed in that position until Napoleon formed the Rhine Confederation in 1806. Monheim, Baumberg and Hitdorf were then combined into a municipal corporation. Monheim gained city status in 1960, ten years after it finally incorporated the neighbouring villages Baumberg and Hitdorf. At the end of 1974 Monheim was incorporated by Düsseldorf as part of a major municipal corporation reform. After a successful complaint in the federal state's constitutional court in Münster, the city became independent again on 1 July 1976, but lost Hitdorf to Leverkusen. Since 1994 the official city name has been Monheim am Rhein.

Sites of interest

 Schelmenturm  – The 26m-high (85 ft) landmark of Monheim is a tower from the early 15th century, which was part of the former fortification built by the Earls of Berg. Since 1972, the tower has been reorganised, also being used as a cultural meeting place.
 Deusserhaus – The Deusser manor house, built around 1848, today is the museum of the Heimatbund (local history society) Monheim e.V.
Haus Bürgel – This house is located on the border between Baumberg and Düsseldorf in a landscape conservation area called "Urdenbacher Kämpe", a flood plain of the Rhine. The earliest source from 1019 states that the "Castrum in Burgela" was built in the 4th century as part of the Roman defences against the Franks on the left bank of the Rhine. In the 14th century, the broadly meandering river changed its bed after a flood, so that Haus Bürgel is actually on the right bank of the Rhine today. Some remains of the Roman walls are still visible, although the place was transformed into a larger Frankish manor house. In recent years, it has been used as a museum and biological-environmental research and information station.
 Gänselieselbrunnen – The fountain known locally as Gänselieselbrunnen is located next to the town hall of Monheim am Rhein.
 Friedenskirche - The Friedenskirche (Peace Church) is a Protestant church in Monheim-Baumberg, built from 1968 to 1974 according to the plans of Walter Maria Foerderer and an outstanding example of Brutalism in the Rhineland.

Transport
Monheim is part of both of the public transport associations Verkehrsverbund Rhein-Ruhr and the Verkehrsverbund Rhein-Sieg, situated on their borders. There are several bus lines running between the city districts, neighbouring towns, and the closest S-Bahn railway station on the border with Langenfeld. Many of Monheim's residents are commuters to nearby Düsseldorf (20 minutes) and Cologne (30 minutes).
The A59 is connected to Monheim, as is the A542 which connects with the nearby A3 and A1.
The town is in the vicinity of both Düsseldorf Airport and the Cologne Bonn Airport.

Twin towns – sister cities

Monheim am Rhein is twinned with:

 Wiener Neustadt, Austria (1971)
 Tirat Carmel, Israel (1989)
 Delitzsch, Germany (1990)
 Bourg-la-Reine, France (2000)
 Malbork, Poland (2005)
 Ataşehir, Turkey (2015)

References

External links 

Towns in North Rhine-Westphalia
Populated places on the Rhine
Mettmann (district)